Khinite is a rare tellurate mineral with the formula Pb2+Cu2+3TeO6(OH)2 It crystallizes in the orthorhombic system and has a bottle-green colour. It is often found as dipyramidal, curved or corroded crystals no more than 0.15 mm in size. The tetragonal dimorph of khinite is called parakhinite.

Occurrence and name
Both khinite and parakhinite were first identified in 1978 in the Old Guard Mine (Royal Guard Mine), Tombstone District, Cochise County, Arizona, US They were named after Ba-Saw Khin, a Burmese-American mineralogist. They are often found together with tenorite, quetzalcoatlite, quartz, gold, dugganite, chrysocolla, chlorargyrite, bromargyrite, xocomecatlite, and tlapallite. Khinite and parakhinite are found in multiple mines across Mexico and the USA.

Parakhinite
Parakhinite crystallizes in the tetragonal system. Khinite and parakhinite are also called khinite-4O and khinite-3T, respectively. Khinite and parakhinite are identical in colour and many other properties, like reactivity. They do differ in optical properties: Khinite is biaxial (+), while parakhinite is uniaxial (-). They also have different unit cells.

References

Tellurate and selenate minerals
Copper(II) minerals
Lead minerals
Hydroxide minerals
Orthorhombic minerals
Minerals in space group 70